Ski Bradford (also known as Bradford Ski Area) is a small ski area located in the Bradford section of Haverhill, Massachusetts.

Terrain

Ski Bradford contains 15 trails: 3 green circles (easiest), 4 blue squares (intermediate) and 8 black diamonds (difficult) including a terrain park.

Mountain's quite easy with short trails. Best for those who wish to go full send in the terrain park or are learning.

Terrain Park

Ski Bradford currently has a fairly large terrain park. The park layout differs every year but a miniature half-pipe is always part of the design. Among the layout are several rails including an A-frame rail and box, 2 or 3 down rails, and 2 small boxes for beginners. Their setup usually has one large kicker and then a few small ramps here and there.

Lift System

Ski Bradford currently has 3 chairlifts, and 6 surface lifts.

Lesson Programs 

Ski Bradford has a large teaching staff and lesson programs. Dozens of schools are involved in after school ski clubs where many of the children involved partake in an hour-long lesson every week. The capacity is there that 30 lessons can be run simultaneously per hour and even more for after school programs where hour-long lessons begin every half hour between 3 and 5 PM. Walk-in lessons are also extremely popular at the area as many guests are spontaneous customers who had not planned for a day of skiing but may have been encouraged to ski by good weather.

References

External links
 Ski Bradford - official site

Buildings and structures in Haverhill, Massachusetts
Ski areas and resorts in Massachusetts
Sports in Essex County, Massachusetts